Bhagwant Roy was an Indian politician who served as Member of Constituent Assembly of India from Patiala and East Punjab States Union.

Personal life 
He was born on January 15, 1917 and died on July 29, 1978 at the age of 61. He has suffered imprisonment for taking part in Congress Satyagrah Movement in 1942.

References 

1917 births
1978 deaths
Members of the Constituent Assembly of India
Punjab, India politicians